Bertil Martinus Grov (born November 3, 1974 in Førde) is a retired archer from Norway.

He finished fourth in the individual event at the 1992 Olympic Games, fifteenth at the 1996 Olympic Games and 41st at the 2000 Olympic Games. He also finished fourth at the 1991 World Indoor Championships. He became Norwegian champion 14 times, and Nordic champion in 1995.

References
Martinus Grov at NRK Sogn og Fjordane County Encyclopedia 

1974 births
Living people
People from Førde
Norwegian male archers
Archers at the 1992 Summer Olympics
Archers at the 1996 Summer Olympics
Archers at the 2000 Summer Olympics
Olympic archers of Norway
Sportspeople from Vestland